Zofia Wichłacz (born 5 April 1995) is a Polish actress. She has appeared in films such as Afterimage and Warsaw 44 and television programmes such as Medics, Głęboka woda, The Romanoffs and World on fire.

Personal life 
Her father Zbigniew Wichłacz is a camera operator and her mother Anna Seitz-Wichłacz is a scenographer.

Career 
She first appeared in a film about the Warsaw Uprising in 2012. She appeared in the made-for-television film The Morality of Mrs. Dulska in 2013, in one episode of Głęboka woda the same year, and in Medics in 2014. She became more well known after starring in Warsaw 44 and won two prestigious Polish awards: the Golden Lion for the best female role during 39th Gdynia Film Festival and the Eagle for the revelation of the year in the 17th Polish Film Awards. Andrzej Wajda had seen Zofia in a play and had decided to cast her in Afterimage, which later turned out to be the director's last production.

In 2019, she starred in the drama series DNA, a multi-company production about illegal adoptions, directed by Henrik Ruben Genz and Kasper Gaardsøe.

Filmography

External links
 
 Polish Film profile

1995 births
Living people
Polish film actresses
Polish television actresses
Actresses from Warsaw
21st-century Polish actresses